Zemědělská ekonomika is a peer-reviewed academic journal published monthly by the Czech Academy of Agricultural Sciences. It has been published since 1954, using the current title since 1999.

References

External links 
 
 Zemědělská ekonomika, National Library of Australia

English-language journals
Monthly journals
Publications established in 1954
Agricultural journals
Economics journals